Alhaji Ibrahim Sly Tetteh (died 3 September 2011) was a Ghanaian football player and administrator who was the President of Liberty Professionals.

Playing career
Tetteh won the West African Club Championship with Sekondi Hasaacas in 1982.

Coaching career
He also ran academies in Ghana, Togo and Kenya and has been credited with discovering the talents of Michael Essien, Sulley Muntari, Asamoah Gyan, Derek Boateng, Kwadwo Asamoah, and John Paintsil.

Personal life
Tetteh was born in Accra and grew up in Sekondi. He attended the Liberty University of Lynchburg, Virginia in the United States from 1992 to 1995.

References

External links
BBC - Ghana's talented talent-spotter

Year of birth missing
Ghanaian footballers
Liberty Professionals F.C.
Footballers from Accra
2011 deaths

Association footballers not categorized by position
Sekondi Hasaacas F.C. players